Karlo may refer to:

 Karlo (name)
 Karlo Island, of the Indian union territory of Andaman and Nicobar Islands
 Karlö, the Swedish name of Hailuoto, Finland

See also

Carlo (disambiguation)
Karlos (disambiguation)
Karly, a given name

|geo